Pyropteron meriaeforme is a moth of the family Sesiidae. It is found in Spain, Portugal, southern France, Italy and on Corsica, Sardinia and Sicily.

The wingspan is 14–15 mm.

The larvae feed on Rumex acetosella.

Subspecies
Pyropteron meriaeforme meriaeforme
Pyropteron meriaeforme venetense (de Joannis, 1908)

References

Moths described in 1840
Sesiidae
Moths of Europe